Shelley Ann Thompson (born 8 February 1984) is a German football striker. Between 2001 and 2013, she played for several Bundesliga teams, Atlanta Beat (WPS) and Regis University Rangers (Denver, Colorado), and has scored 1 goal in 2 caps for the German national team. She is of South African and Zimbabwean descent.

Honours
Top scorer Bundesliga: 2005
Top scorer UEFA Women's Under-19 Championship: 2003

References

1984 births
Living people
German women's footballers
German expatriate women's footballers
German people of South African descent
German people of Zimbabwean descent
FCR 2001 Duisburg players
Expatriate women's soccer players in the United States
Hamburger SV (women) players
VfL Wolfsburg (women) players
Atlanta Beat (WPS) players
Bayer 04 Leverkusen (women) players
SC 07 Bad Neuenahr players
SGS Essen players
Women's Professional Soccer players
Regis University alumni
Women's association football forwards
Germany women's international footballers